The 1997 NatWest Trophy was the 17th NatWest Trophy.  It was an English limited overs county cricket tournament which was held between 24 June and 7 September 1997. The tournament was won by Essex County Cricket Club who defeated Warwickshire County Cricket Club by 9 wickets in the final at Lord's.

Format and highlights
The 18 first-class counties, were joined by eleven Minor Counties:  Bedfordshire, Berkshire, Buckinghamshire, Cambridgeshire, Cumberland, Devon, Herefordshire, Lincolnshire, Norfolk, Shropshire and Staffordshire.

The Ireland, Scotland and Netherlands teams also participated. There was some controversy in the semi final at the County Ground, Chelmsford, when in a tense contest Mark Ilott of Essex and Robert Croft of Glamorgan had an on-field confrontation.

The final at Lord's which was held on 7 September 1997 and was won by Essex with Stuart Law scoring 80 and collecting the Man of the Match medal.

First round

Second round

Quarter-finals

Semi-finals

Final

References

External links
CricketArchive tournament page 

Friends Provident Trophy seasons
Natwest Trophy, 1997
NatWest Group